István Szabó (born 18 February 1938) is a Hungarian film director, screenwriter, and opera director.

Szabó is one of the most notable Hungarian filmmakers and one who has been best known outside the Hungarian-speaking world since the late 1960s. István Szabó's films are based on the tradition of the European auteurism that represent many aspects of the political and psychological conflicts of Central Europe's recent history often inspired by his own personal biography. He made his debut as a student in 1959, creating a short film  at the Academy of Drama and Film in Budapest, and his first feature film was released in 1964.

He achieved his greatest international success with Mephisto (1981) for which  he was awarded an Oscar in the best foreign language film category. Since then, most of Szabó's films have been international co-productions made in a variety of languages. His films are shot in European locations. However, he continues to make films in Hungarian, and even in his international co-productions he prefers to choose Hungary for filming locations, relying on Hungarian talents in the making. In 2006, Szabó stirred controversy when a weekly Hungarian magazine called Élet és Irodalom (Life and Literature in English) published an article about that he had been an informant to the communist regime's secret service.

Life
Born to Mária Szabó (née Vita) and István Szabó who was a doctor, in Budapest. The father's side of his family had a long tradition of choosing a career in medicine. His family is of Jewish origin that converted to catholicism. Even so, the Arrow Cross Party still considered them Jews before the end of WW II. Regent Miklós Horthy declared that Hungary had quit the war, seeking an armistice with belligerent countries. As a result,  the Arrow Cross Party rose to power with the support of the Nazi Germany, and his family had to split up and take refuge to escape persecution. Szabó made it through the war, hiding in an orphanage, but his father died of diphtheria shortly after the German defeat. Later on, his films draw heavily on these memories of his childhood.

In 2006, Szabó stirred controversy when a weekly Hungarian magazine called Élet és Irodalom (Life and Literature in English) published an article revealing he had been an informant for the communist regime's secret service. Between 1957 and 1961, he submitted forty-eight reports on seventy-two people. Most of the time, he made reports about classmates and teachers at the Academy of Drama and Film in Budapest. According to historian István Deák, just a tip-off Szabó had made, had a negative influence on someone, when an individual was denied a passport.

After the article had been published, over one hundred prominent intellectuals, including some of those whom Szabó had made reports about, signed a supporting letter to stand up for him. Szabó's initial rection to the article was that his cooperation with the communist secret service was coerced and might be regarded as an act of bravery since he intended to save the life of his former classmate Pál Gábor. A 2010 publication asserted that "whether this is true or not is impossible to prove as not much has remained of Szabó's file and as revelations about the murky past of prominent figures such as Sazbó have become mired in controversy."

In a 2001 interview, Szabó revealed that he believes in God, but considers the subject personal and does not like to talk about it.

Career

Pre–1964
As a child, Szabó wanted to be a doctor like his father. By the age of 16, however, he developed an interest in filmmaking under the influence of a book written by Hungarian film theorist Béla Balázs. After finishing high school, he was one of 11 applicants out of 800, who were admitted to the Academy of Drama and Film in Budapest, where he studied under Félix Máriássy. His classmates included  Judit Elek, Zsolt Kézdi-Kovács, János Rózsa, Pál Gábor, Imre Gyöngyössy, Ferenc Kardos, and Zoltán Huszárik among others. During this period, Szabó directed several short films, most notably his thesis film, Koncert (1963). The film earned a prize at the International Short Film Festival Oberhausen. Afterwards he was apprenticed to CEO of the Hunnia Film Studio, János Herskó, which opened up the opportunity for him to direct his first feature film at the age of 25 rather than spending ten years working as an assistant director as would have required.

István Szabó started out his career at the time when the “new wave” in Hungarian cinema got underway [at a time when the phenomenon was taking place in the film industry all over  Western and Eastern Europe]. The new wave in Eastern Europe began against a backdrop of political liberalization, the decentralization of film industries, and the emergence of films as valuable commodities for export to Western European markets. As a result the films became more formally experimental, politically anti-establishments, and, especially in the case of Szabó, psychologically probing than the films of the previous generation . The Hungarian filmmakers in particular experienced a significant increase in freedom of expression due to reforms of the Kádár government.

Hungarian films, 1964–1980
Szabó's first feature film, The Age of Illusions (1964), is a partly autobiographical film about how Szabó's generation struggled to start a career. it focuses  on what experiences they had when they first became entrants to the labour market, meanwhile they had to overcome the difficulties the older generation had posed for them, that also set the stage for developing romantic relationships amongst themselves. The appearance of a poster for François Truffaut's The 400 Blows in the background of a scene suggests Szabó's artistic compatibility with Truffaut and the French New Wave. The film won the Silver Sail for Best First Work at the Locarno International Film Festival and a Special Jury Prize for Best Director at the Hungarian Film Festival.

Father (1966) is a coming of age story that displays Szabó's increasing fascination with history and his childhood memories. The plot covers events from the Arrow Cross party's dictatorship to the Hungarian Revolution of 1956, revolving around the orientation disorder and self awareness of a generation that had to grow up without a father figure in wartime. The main character replaces the image of his absent father figure with fantasy images that keep changing with time. These events take place during a period of his life when he began his transition to adulthood. Finally, he is able to face his own situation and comes to understand as a university student that he has to rely on his own strength rather than that of an idealised father figure. The film won the Grand Prix at the 5th Moscow International Film Festival and the Special Jury Prize at Locarno, and established Szabó as the most internationally famous Hungarian filmmaker of his time, as well as an auteur in the European film tradition. In 2000, Father appeared as number 11 on a list of the 12 best Hungarian films according to a group of Hungarian film critics.

Lovefilm (1970) focuses on a young man's relationship with his childhood sweetheart, told through flashbacks that include the Arrow Cross dictatorship and 1956, and rendered in an experimental, fragmented form. This experimental tendency in Szabó's films reached its apotheosis in 25 Fireman Street (1973), which began as a short film, Dream About a House (1971). 25 Fireman Street takes place during the course of a long, hot night in Budapest, during which the residents of a single apartment building are plagued by dream-memories of pain and loss spanning thirty years, including both World Wars, the Arrow Cross dictatorship, the Communist takeover, and 1956. While the film won the top prize at Locarno, Szabó was upset by its lack of success at the box office and at film festivals. Attributing this lack of success to the film's complex structure, he decided to give his next film a simpler structure.

In Budapest Tales (1976), Szabó traded his earlier, complex narrative structures, characterized by flashbacks and dreams, for a more linear one. At the same time, he traded the literal representation of history for an allegorical one. The film follows a disparate group of people who come together on the outskirts of an unnamed city at the end of an unnamed war to repair a damaged tram and ride it into the city. Allegorically, the film was interpreted by critics variously as representing Hungarian history specifically or universal human responses to war and reconstruction more generally.

Szabó's first four full-length films featured the actor András Bálint in roles based on Szabó himself. While Bálint also appeared in Budapest Tales, this was Szabó's first feature film that did not contain a significant amount of autobiographical material. He did not make another autobiographical film until Meeting Venus, eighteen years later.

Budapest Tales was even less successful than 25 Fireman Street at the box office and festivals. According to author David Paul, this may explain why Szabó shifted gears even more dramatically in his next film, Confidence (1980), in which historical events are represented straightforwardly, and are filtered through neither memory nor allegory. The film focuses on the relationship between a man and woman who are forced to share a room as they hide from the Arrow Cross toward the end of the Second World War. It garnered a Best Director award for Szabó at the Berlin Film Festival and was nominated for the Academy Award for Best Foreign Language Film at the 53rd Academy Awards.

International co-productions featuring Brandauer, 1981–1988
Szabó's next three films constituted a new phase in his career—moving away from Hungarian productions, in Hungarian, written by Szabó alone, and featuring Bálint, and moving toward international co-productions, in German, written by Szabó in collaboration with others, and featuring Austrian actor Klaus Maria Brandauer. The informal trilogy—Mephisto (1981), Colonel Redl (1985) and Hanussen (1988)—features Brandauer in a series of roles based on historical figures who, as represented in the films, compromised their morals in order to climb the ladder of success within a context of authoritarian political power. In Mephisto, based on a novel by Klaus Mann, Brandauer plays an actor and theater director in Nazi Germany, a role based on Mann's former brother-in-law Gustaf Gründgens. The film won the Academy Award for Best Foreign Language Film, and the award for Best Screenplay at the Cannes Film Festival, and greatly increased Szabó's international prestige.

In Colonel Redl, Brandauer plays Alfred Redl, counter-intelligence chief of the Austro-Hungarian Empire who was blackmailed into espionage for the Russians in order to prevent the revelation of his homosexuality. The film won top awards in Germany and the UK, but provoked a scandal in Austria, where several periodicals accused the film of bringing the country into disrepute. In Hanussen, Brandauer plays the real life clairvoyant performer Erik Jan Hanussen, whose growing fame brings him into increasingly close—and dangerous—contact with the Nazis.

1991–present
After his Brandauer trilogy, Szabó continued to make international co-productions, filming in a variety of languages and European locations. He has continued to make some films in Hungarian, however, and even in his international co-productions, he often films in Hungary and uses Hungarian talent.

Meeting Venus (1991), the first of several English-language films directed by Szabó—and his first comedy—is based on his experience directing Tannhäuser at the Paris Opera in 1984. Niels Arestrup plays a Hungarian directing the opera at an imaginary pan-European opera company, and encountering a multitude of pitfalls that symbolize the challenges of a united Europe. An inside joke was that the multinational characters were all named with translations of "Taylor", which is the meaning of "Szabó".

With Sweet Emma, Dear Böbe (1992), Szabó returned to a strictly Hungarian subject—this time, however, focused on a contemporary, rather than historical, social problem. The film follows two young, female teachers of Russian facing the obsolescence of their specialty after the fall of the socialist government, as well as a variety of types of sexual harassment in the new Hungary. The film won the top prize at the Berlin Film Festival.

Sunshine (1999)—a three-hour historical epic, and an English-language, international co-production—was viewed by many critics as Szabó's most ambitious film, and, along with Mephisto, his most important. Hungary's Jews had figured in either a marginal or coded fashion in several of Szabó's earlier films, produced during the socialist period when discourse around the history of the country's Jews was more circumscribed. In Sunshine, for the first time, Szabó focused explicitly on this aspect of Hungarian history, which he himself had experienced as a child during the Arrow Cross dictatorship. Ralph Fiennes plays three generations in the Sonnenschein family as they experience the trials of twentieth-century Hungarian Jewish history, from the late Austro-Hungarian Empire through the Holocaust to the 1956 Revolution.

Several characters are based on real people, including the Zwack family, with their successful liquor business, the Olympic fencer Attila Petschauer, and the Jewish police official Ernö Szücs. The film won European Film Awards for Best Screenwriter, Best Actor, and Best Cinematographer. It received a rating of 74% Fresh from review aggregator Rotten Tomatoes.

An example of an extremely positive review was that of Roger Ebert of the Chicago Sun-Times, who called it “a movie of substance and thrilling historical sweep.” A. O. Scott of the New York Times had a more mixed reaction, writing that, by the end, “the movie has accumulated sufficient power and momentum to erase the memory of its earlier awkwardness. It shows such sympathy for its characters, and approaches its subject with such intelligence, that it's easy to forgive the clumsy editing, the haphazard insertion of black-and-white newsreels, and the hyperventilating sexual ardor that seems to be a Sors family curse.”

In Taking Sides (2001), Szabó returned to thematic territory he had explored in Mephisto. Stellan Skarsgård plays real life German conductor Wilhelm Furtwängler, and Harvey Keitel a U.S. Army investigator interrogating Furtwängler about his collaboration with the Nazis. The film won several awards at the Mar del Plata Film Festival in Argentina, including Best Director.

Being Julia (2004), based on a novel by W. Somerset Maugham, stars Annette Bening as a famous British actress experiencing a series of romantic and professional rivalries. Bening won a Golden Globe Award for her performance.

In 2005, Szabó was awarded the Lifetime Achievement Award at the 27th Moscow International Film Festival.

Rokonok (2006) was a Hungarian production based on a 1932 novel by Zsigmond Móricz about political corruption. Sándor Csányi plays a newly elected attorney general whose relatives (rokonok) come out of the woodwork looking for favors. It was entered into the 28th Moscow International Film Festival.

The Door (2012), an English language production based on a Hungarian novel by Magda Szabó (no relation), focuses on the relationship between an affluent novelist (Martina Gedeck) and her poor, mysterious maid (Helen Mirren). It opened the 13th Tbilisi International Film Festival, and won the Michael Curtiz Audience Award at the Hungarian Film Festival of Los Angeles.

Szabó's frequent collaborators have included actors András Bálint, Klaus Maria Brandauer, Péter Andorai, and Ildikó Bánsági; cinematographer Lajos Koltai; and screenwriters Péter Dobai and Andrea Vészits.

Themes
Several interconnected themes run through Szabó's films, the most common being the relationship between the personal and the political or historical. On the personal level, his first three feature films deal with coming of age issues, but political/historical events form the backdrop of these issues and continually rupture the attempts of the characters to lead their private lives. In an interview in 2008, Szabó said, “My mother once told me, 'We had a nice childhood and our youth was beautiful, but our life was destroyed by politics and history.'” The political/historical events most commonly depicted are the dominant traumatic events of mid-20th century Hungarian and Central European history—Nazism, the Second World War, and, in Hungary—or, more accurately, Budapest—the Arrow Cross dictatorship and the Holocaust, the Communist takeover, and the 1956 Revolution. Szabó himself has frequently referred to this theme as the search for security.

A related theme is the moral compromises individuals make in order to succeed in immoral political systems. In an interview about Taking Sides, Szabó said, “I don't think that life is possible without making compromises. The question is only one of limits: how far to go. When one crosses the line, then the compromise starts to be a bad, even deadly, one.” This theme is dominant in the Brandauer trilogy and, as Istvan Deak points out, may be related to Szabó's own collaboration with the Communist secret police.

Another closely related theme is the arts—most often theater, but also music and film itself. In several of Szabó's films—most famously in Mephisto—artists become caught up in conflicts around politics, role-playing, and identity.

Style
Szabó's early films—culminating in Lovefilm and 25 Fireman Street—were influenced by the French New Wave in their experimentation with flashbacks, dream sequences, and unconventional narrative structures built on these techniques.

Szabó emphasizes iconography in his films, insofar as he tends to invest certain objects and places with symbolic meaning. Tram cars play this role in many of his films, and one becomes the central image in Budapest Tales. Budapest itself plays an important role in many of his films, including scenes of the Danube and of buildings Szabó lived in when he was a child.

Acting also plays a key role in Szabó's films, as he values psychological complexity in his central characters. In his first several features, he tended to use the same lead actors over and over—first András Bálint, then Klaus Maria Brandauer. Consistent with this focus on acting, he frequently employs long close-up shots to emphasize the play of emotions on the faces of his characters.

Other work
In addition to writing and directing films, Szabó has also served in a variety of other capacities in the film industry, including writing and directing television movies and episodes, short films, and documentaries, as well as serving as assistant director, screenwriter, producer, and actor in films directed by others. In 1969, he was a member of the jury at the 6th Moscow International Film Festival.

Szabó has directed several operas, including Tannhäuser in Paris, Boris Godunov in Leipzig, Il Trovatore in Vienna, and [[Three sisters (opera)|Three Sisters]]'' in Budapest. He has taught at film schools in Budapest, London, Berlin, and Vienna. In 1989, he was one of the founding members of the European Film Academy, and, in 1992, of the Széchenyi Academy of Literature and Arts.

Filmography

Television

Appearances in documentaries

See also
Cinema of Hungary
Culture of Hungary
Jacob Sager Weinstein

References

1938 births
Directors of Best Foreign Language Film Academy Award winners
European Film Award for Best Screenwriter winners
Filmmakers who won the Best Foreign Language Film BAFTA Award
German-language film directors
Hungarian film directors
Hungarian Jews
Hungarian male film actors
Hungarian spies
Male actors from Budapest
Members of the Academy of Arts, Berlin
Recipients of the Medal of Pushkin
Silver Bear for Best Director recipients
Living people
Male screenwriters
20th-century screenwriters
Cannes Film Festival Award for Best Screenplay winners
Members of the Széchenyi Academy of Literature and Arts